Pseudodaphnella sudafricana is a species of sea snail, a marine gastropod mollusk in the family Raphitomidae.

Description

Distribution
This marine species occurs off Southern Madagascar

References

External links
 Fedosov A. E. & Puillandre N. (2012) Phylogeny and taxonomy of the Kermia–Pseudodaphnella (Mollusca: Gastropoda: Raphitomidae) genus complex: a remarkable radiation via diversification of larval development. Systematics and Biodiversity 10(4): 447-477
 Gastropods.com: Pseudodaphnella sudafricana

sudafricana
Gastropods described in 2012